Jean Joseph Ernest Theodore Gambart (12 October 1814 – 12 April 1902) was a Belgian-born English art publisher and dealer who dominated the London art world in the middle of the nineteenth century.

Life and career
Gambart was born in Kortrijk, the son of a printer, binder and bookseller. By the age of 19, he had moved to Paris where he established his own print and papermaking business. He soon became known to the well-established Goupil print publishers, for whom he moved to England in 1840 to establish a branch in London. He soon struck out on his own again in 1842, this time in partnership with one Mr. Junin, to form the company Gambart & Junin which specialised in the import of art prints from Europe. The company was a success, and by early in 1844, the company was established as publishers as well as importers and exporters.

Art publisher
Gambart soon gained a reputation as a leading publisher of fine art prints. He established fair and mutually beneficial agreements with most of the best known British and European artists of the mid-Victorian period, including Edwin Landseer, John Everett Millais, Rosa Bonheur, Lawrence Alma-Tadema, William Holman Hunt, John Linnell, J. M. W. Turner, David Roberts, Frederick Goodall, Dante Gabriel Rossetti, Ford Madox Brown and William Powell Frith. He was a friend to many of these artists, and helped establish the reputation of some. For example, in 1855, he brought Rosa Bonheur to England with her monumental piece, The Horse Fair, which he purchased and which she showed to Queen Victoria at Windsor Castle in a private audience. For the same visit, he arranged a sojourn to Scotland where Bonheur made sketches for later works. He published many of her paintings as steel engraved reproductions. Through his efforts, she became better known in England than her native France. 

The Dutch-born Alma-Tadema benefited in a similar manner ten years later. He met Gambart in 1864 and Gambart was impressed by the young man's work. Gambart arranged an exhibition in London in 1865 and promoted his work while the artist remained in Belgium. Alma-Tadema finally moved to London in 1870.

Gambart worked with some of the finest engravers and technicians of his day to create works as close to the artist's intent as possible in a black and white medium. Among the craftsmen he employed were Charles George Lewis. Gambart later also employed colour lithography.

His attention to quality paid off both in the arrangements he maintained with leading artists (his career lasted 25 years) and also in sales. Among his best selling reproductions were William Holman Hunt's The Light of the World (1858), an inspiring and highly influential image of Christ, and William Powell Frith's The Derby Day (1858).

Original works
Gambart expanded into original works by 1849. By now established with an address in London's Pall Mall, his first exhibition was the bronzes of Pierre-Jules Mène, sculptor of animals. In time, his exhibitions, often featuring French artists, became known as the French Gallery and artists coveted an appearance on the gallery walls. Later moving to King Street, St. James, Gambart would alternate British artists with those of Continental European ones. He was among the first to sell art in this way. Prior to his galleries, most fine art was sold by the artist directly to the buyer, who was often a patron. His friendship with artists and buyers, including pen-maker and well-known patron Joseph Gillott, as well as with critics, would become a model for how modern art business would be run. He was among the top three dealers in London at a time when art was in high demand. His competitors were Agnew and Colnaghi.

Personal life
Gambart became a British subject in 1846. He was married three times but he had no children. His third wife, Annie (1835–1870), was 16 years old when he married her. His London home was called "Rosenstead" in Avenue Road near Regent's Park. There, he and Annie gave lavish parties that were the talk of the London scene. He eventually sold Rosenstead to his friend and artist Frederick Goodall. Gambart retired a wealthy man in 1870 and passed the business on to his nephew, Léon Henri Lefèvre who continued to run it under the name of Pilgeram & Lefèvre. The Lefevre Gallery at 30 Bruton Street, London, survived until 2002. Gambart and his wife moved to Nice where they had a marble palace, known as "Les Palmiers", built to his specifications. He was the Spanish Consul-General in Nice. His remaining link to his native Belgium was a summer chateau at Spa. He died in Nice in 1902. Avenue Gambart in Nice (a small cul-de-sac boulevard de Cambrai) was named for him.

Honours
 Member of the Royal Victorian Order (1898).

Notes

References
 Biography by Richard Goodall
 Biography featuring a portrait of Annie Gambart
 Gambart and the problem of copyright in the Victorian Age

Further reading
 Jeremy Maas, Gambart, Prince of the Victorian Art World, London: Barrie and Jenkins, 1975
 Norbert Hostyn, Ernest Gambart, in : Nationaal Biografisch Woordenboek, 16, Brussels, 2002.
 Pamela M. Fletcher, Creating the French Gallery: Ernest Gambart and the Rise of the Commercial Art Gallery in Mid-Victorian London, Nineteenth-Century Art Worldwide, vol. 6, issue 1, Spring 2007

1814 births
1902 deaths
Art dealers from London
Members of the Royal Victorian Order
Papermakers
People from Kortrijk
Belgian emigrants to the United Kingdom
19th-century English businesspeople